Penny Lang (July 15, 1942 – July 31, 2016) was a Canadian folk music icon who earned a loyal following, influencing many artists. She performed at major folk festivals and clubs across North America.

Early years

Lang was born in 1942 to a musical family in east end Montreal.  She learned about singing and storytelling around the family’s kitchen table and started performing publicly at age 10 with her family in a revue called “The Irish and Canadian Musical Revue” that played legion halls, theaters, hospitals and prisons.  In her late teens, Lang got caught up in the folk revival.

Career

In 1963, at age 21, Lang became a professional folksinger and worked initially at the Café André, a venue near the McGill University campus, for three years.  She quickly became a star on the Montreal folk scene, filling the club every night with a loyal returning audience drawn by her effective guitar-playing, throaty voice, and most of all by her astonishing ability to connect with the people she was singing to.  Lang moved on to become a touring artist, playing major folk festivals like Mariposa and Philadelphia and legendary clubs like Gerde’s Folk City in New York City, Caffè Lena in Saratoga Springs, N.Y., the Riverboat in Toronto and Le Hibou in Ottawa.

Her powerful interpretations and originals in folk, blues, country, and gospel gained her a large and devoted following.  Her songs are emotionally powerful observations of the human condition, sometimes poignant, sometimes hilarious, mostly memorable.  A major highlight of her career was her 1970 sold-out concert at Théâtre Port Royal at Place des Arts in Montreal.  After an extended time away from professional life living in Morin Heights, a small village in the Laurentian Mountains where she raised her son Jason, she returned to full-time performing and was welcomed back to an adoring public.  She returned to the studio in 1989 and recorded nine well-received albums for the She-Wolf, Festival and Borealis labels and toured Australia, Italy, Denmark, France and the United Kingdom.

Death

Penny died on July 31, 2016 at her home in Madeira Park on British Columbia’s Sunshine Coast, where she had been living since 2005.

Legacy

Penny shared a lifetime's familiarity with folk, blues, gospel and country songs with audiences and friends wherever she went and will be fondly remembered for her work on the concert stage.  Her intimate performances were filled with laughter, tears and a bonding with the audience to create a community through song.

Honors and awards

Penny’s story was the subject of the 1999 documentary Stand Up: On High Ground with Penny Lang by Jocelyne Clarke, which premiered at the Silver Images Film Festival in Chicago.  She received the first Prix Folqui awarded by FOLQUEBEC in 2003.

Lang's 2001 album, Gather Honey, was nominated for a JUNO Award.

Discography

  "Live at The Yellow Door", She-Wolf, 1992; Festival, 1998
  "Yes", She-Wolf, 1991; Festival, 1993
  "Ain't Life Sweet", She-Wolf, 1993, 2007
  "Carry On Children", She-Wolf, 1996
  "Penny Lang & Friends Live", She-Wolf, 1998
  "Somebody  Else", She-Wolf, 1999
  "Gather Honey", Borealis, 2001
  "Stone + Sand + Sea + Sky", Borealis, 2006
  "Live", She-Wolf, 2007

References

http://singout.org/2016/08/07/penny-lang-1942-2016/
http://montrealgazette.com/entertainment/music/obituary-penny-lang-star-of-montreals-folk-music-scene-dies-at-74
http://montreal.ctvnews.ca/folk-singer-penny-lang-dies-at-age-74-1.3011271
https://www.facebook.com/Penny-Lang-Official-Fan-Page-113201075372182/
https://www.youtube.com/watch?v=55Iz1cFPwLg
https://borealisrecords.com/artists/penny-lang/
http://www.allmusic.com/artist/penny-lang-mn0000258865/discography

1942 births
2016 deaths
Canadian folk singer-songwriters